Sanxianci Subdistrict is a subdistrict in Yanjiang District, Ziyang, Sichuan, China. As of 2010, the subdistrict's population totaled 51,739.

History 
In November 2005, Sanxianci was upgraded from a town to a subdistrict.

Administrative divisions 
As of 2020, Sanxianci Subdistrict administers 12 residential communities:

 Heyanzui Community
 Sanxianci Community
 Aiguo Community
 Fengling Community
 Ma'an Community
 Xiangzhang Community
 Xinfu Community
 Jinghua Community
 Binhe Community
 Sisanyi Community
 Shizishan Community
 Huaguoshan Community

References 

Subdistricts of the People's Republic of China
Township-level divisions of Sichuan
Ziyang